The Khanka gudgeon (Squalidus chankaensis) is a species of cyprinid, an East Asian freshwater fish that occurs from the Amur basin in Russia, through China, Mongolia and Japan, to Vietnam.

References

Squalidus
Taxa named by Benedykt Dybowski
Fish described in 1872